snRNA-activating protein complex subunit 3 is a protein that in humans is encoded by the SNAPC3 gene.

Interactions 

SNAPC3 has been shown to interact with SNAPC1 and retinoblastoma protein.

References

Further reading